The Joslyn Art Museum is the principal fine arts museum in the state of Nebraska, United States.  Located in Omaha, it was opened in 1931 at the initiative of Sarah H. Joslyn in memory of her husband, businessman George A. Joslyn. It is the only museum in the state with a comprehensive permanent collection, and although it includes works from Paolo Veronese, El Greco,  Titian, among others, its greatest strengths are the outstanding art collections of the nineteenth and twentieth centuries of American and European artists such as Pierre-Auguste Renoir, Jackson Pollock and William-Adolphe Bouguereau.

History

In 1928, Kiewit started construction of the museum. Opening on November 29, 1931, as a gift to the people of Omaha from Sarah H. Joslyn in memory of her husband, George A. Joslyn; It occupies a large and impressive Art Deco building designed by John and Alan McDonald, constructed of Georgia Pink marble, with 38 different marbles from all over the world in the interior, close to downtown Omaha.  The decorative panels on the exterior were designed by sculptor John David Brcin and refer to the peoples of the plains - the original Native American inhabitants and the later European explorers and settlers.  Inscriptions carved on the building were written by Hartley Burr Alexander. A substantial extension, designed by Lord Norman Foster, opened in 1994.

In 2008, construction began on the Joslyn Sculpture Garden. The garden opened in summer 2009 featuring work from local and national artists as well as a reflecting pool and waterfall. Shortly after its opening, the garden hosted the 24th annual Jazz on the Green festival which it hosted until 2010 when Omaha Performing Arts began producing the event and moved it to the Midtown Crossing at Turner Park which could development to better accommodate the growing event.  The free eight-week festival features locally, regionally, and nationally-known jazz musicians and draws thousands of spectators who can sit on the lawn with picnic snacks to enjoy the performances.

In May 2013, the Museum stopped charging general admission, again providing free access to the public as it had done from its opening until the mid-1960s.

In July 2021, work started on a 42,000 square foot expansion, called the Rhonda and Howard Hawks Pavilion. The expansion is slated to open in 2024.  The museum was temporarily closed to the public in spring 2022 until the new pavilion opens.

Collections
The permanent collections of the Joslyn Art Museum are:

Ancient, including an exceptional collection of Greek pottery
European: 16th- and 17th-century works include paintings by Veronese, Titian, Claude Lorrain, Rembrandt and El Greco.  However the strongest collections are from the 19th century, including romantic works by Delacroix and Gustave Doré, realist works by Corot and Gustave Courbet, and an impressionist works by Degas, Monet, Pissarro, and Renoir
American: the collection includes early American portraiture by James Peale and Mather Brown; many works by painters of the Hudson River School, realist works by Winslow Homer and Thomas Eakins, and works by the American impressionists Childe Hassam and William Merritt Chase
Western American: including important collections of work by the Swiss artist Karl Bodmer based on his 1832-34 journey to the Missouri River frontier, and by Alfred Jacob Miller, also illustrating the West of the 1830s.
Native American: including both traditional works and work done under the influence of, or in reaction against, European conventions and training.
Twentieth Century: a wide range of 20th-century painting and sculpture is represented, including paintings by Henri Matisse, Stuart Davis, Theodore Roszak, John Sloan and Robert Henri, and sculpture by Deborah Butterfield, Robert Haozous, Donald Judd, Sol LeWitt and Martin Puryear.  The collection stresses  significant American artistic movements, including regionalism (with paintings by Grant Wood and Thomas Hart Benton) and Abstract Expressionism (with work by Jackson Pollock, Hans Hofmann, and Helen Frankenthaler) and Pop Art (with work by George Segal and Tom Wesselmann).

Although the best known names appear in the European and American collections, it is probably the Western American and Native American collections that have the greatest importance as collections, allowing a rare opportunity to study these genres and periods of art as well as giving an important insight into the history of the western United States.

In addition to its permanent collections, the museum mounts regular special exhibitions. It also serves as an important regional educational and artistic resource, and its building includes an auditorium where regular concerts are held.

Gallery

See also
Joslyn Castle

References

External links

Official Joslyn Art Museum website

Museums in Omaha, Nebraska
Art Deco architecture in Nebraska
History of Midtown Omaha, Nebraska
Art museums and galleries in Nebraska
Art museums established in 1931
1931 establishments in Nebraska
Asian art museums in the United States
Museums of ancient Greece in the United States